The following are the national records in Olympic weightlifting in Finland. Records are maintained in each weight class for the snatch lift, clean and jerk lift, and the total for both lifts by the Finnish Weightlifting Federation (Suomen Painonnostoliitto).

Current records

Men

Women

Historical records

Men (1998–2018)

Women (1998–2018)

References
General
Finnish records 8 December 2022 updated
Specific

External links
 Finnish Weightlifting Federation website

Finland
records
Olympic weightlifting
weightlifting